The 1990–91 Alpha Ethniki was the 55th season of the highest football league of Greece. The season began on 16 September 1990 and ended on 2 June 1991. Panathinaikos won their second consecutive and 16th Greek title.

The point system was: Win: 2 points - Draw: 1 point.

Teams

Stadia and personnel

 1 On final match day of the season, played on 2 June 1991.

League table

Results

Top scorers

External links
Official Greek FA Site
RSSSF
Greek SuperLeague official Site
SuperLeague Statistics
 

Alpha Ethniki seasons
Greece
1